Juan de Dios de Arguinao y Gutiérrez, OP (April 1588 – 5 October 1678) was a prelate of the Catholic Church in the Viceroyalty of Peru. He served as bishop of Santa Cruz de la Sierra from 1646 to 1659, and as archbishop of Santafé in Nueva Granada (now Bogotá) from 1659 until his death in 1678.

Biography 
Arguinao y Gutiérrez was born in Lima, Viceroyalty of Peru, in April 1588. He joined the Dominican Order and was ordained a priest.

On 10 September 1646, Pope Innocent X appointed Arguinao bishop of Santa Cruz de la Sierra in what is now Bolivia. He was consecrated bishop on 17 November 1647 by Pedro de Villagómez Vivanco, the archbishop of Lima. He served there until 1659, when he became archbishop of Santafé en Nueva Granada (now the Archdiocese of Bogotá in what is now Colombia). He was selected to that position on 10 July 1659, and was confirmed on 10 November of that year.

Arguinao served as archbishop until his death on 5 October 1678, in Bogotá, at the age of 90.

Episcopal lineage 
 Bishop Diego de Romano y Govea (1578)
 Archbishop Bartolomé Lobo Guerrero (1597)
 Archbishop Hernando de Arias y Ugarte (1614)
 Archbishop Pedro de Villagómez Vivanco (1633)
 Archbishop Juan de Arguinao y Gutiérrez (1647)

References

External links and additional sources
 (for Chronology of Bishops) 
 (for Chronology of Bishops) 
 (for Chronology of Bishops) 
 (for Chronology of Bishops) 

1588 births
1678 deaths
People from Lima
Peruvian emigrants to Bolivia
Peruvian emigrants to Colombia
17th-century Peruvian Roman Catholic priests
17th-century Roman Catholic bishops in Bolivia
17th-century Roman Catholic archbishops in New Granada
Roman Catholic archbishops of Bogotá
Dominican bishops
Peruvian Dominicans
Colombian Dominicans
Peruvian people of Spanish descent
Roman Catholic bishops of Santa Cruz de la Sierra